Planopilumnidae is a family of crustaceans belonging to superfamily Pseudozioidea in the order Decapoda.

Genera

The family contains five genera:

 Flindersoplax Davie, 1989
 Haemocinus P.K.L.Ng, 2003
 Planopilumnus Balss, 1933
 Platychelonion Crosnier & Guinot, 1969
 Rathbunaria Ward, 1933

References

Decapods
Decapod families